A hypercoaster can mean one of two things:

Any continuous-circuit roller coaster with a height or drop measuring greater than 200 feet
	
Or, more narrowly:

Other roller coaster manufacturers developed models with custom names, including Mega Coasters from Intamin, Hyper Coasters from Bolliger & Mabillard, and Hyper-Hybrid Coasters from Rocky Mountain Construction.

History
The world's first hypercoaster was Magnum XL-200 by Cedar Point, costing $8 million to construct. Cedar Point hired Arrow Dynamics for the design and construction began in 1988. Since its debut on May 6, 1989, Magnum XL-200 has accommodated over 36 million riders. Cedar Point's official blog states that after building the ride, "...discussion was focused on just what a roller coaster such as Magnum should be called. After all, it had no loops like most of the other large steel coasters of the time and was so much bigger and faster than its non-looping brethren. After a couple of years, the name everyone agreed upon was hypercoaster."

Description
Hypercoasters were originally built for speed and airtime, to counter the trend of constructing bigger and bigger looping coasters. To accomplish this the elements of a hypercoaster often include a large first drop, several additional drops of declining height, a large turn or helix, and then many airtime-inducing hills. Hypercoasters are commonly designed with an out and back layout, although there are occasionally hypercoasters that use a twisted layout, such as Raging Bull at Six Flags Great America, and others that combine both, such as Diamondback at Kings Island.

Hypercoasters are highly-ranked in the annual Amusement Today Golden Ticket Awards. For 2006, Six Flags New England's Superman: Ride of Steel (later named Bizarro and Superman The Ride) was ranked in first place. Others such as Magnum XL-200 (third), Nitro (fourth), and Apollo's Chariot (fifth) followed closely behind in the top five, with hypercoasters making up the majority of the Top 10 Steel Coasters in 2006. By 2010, hypercoasters completely filled the top 10, as well as 16 of the top 20.

Hypercoasters were first manufactured by Arrow Dynamics in the late 1980s to early 1990s. Since then, a number of companies, including Bolliger & Mabillard, Intamin, D. H. Morgan Manufacturing, Giovanola and others have designed and constructed hypercoasters.

Though hypercoasters are typically steel roller coasters, Son of Beast at Kings Island was the first and only wooden hypercoaster. Due to a number of issues, the ride was eventually demolished in 2012.
In 2018, Cedar Point opened the first hybrid hypercoaster,  Steel Vengeance. Steel Vengeance is the first hypercoaster manufactured by Rocky Mountain Construction.

Bolliger & Mabillard

Bolliger & Mabillard (B&M) produced 18 models over 21 years of production of hyper coasters, making it one of the more successful models manufactured by the company.

The first installation of the hyper coaster was Apollo's Chariot located in Busch Gardens Williamsburg. It was one of the two models released in 1999. The other being the Floorless Coaster. It was made in a similar style to the TOGO, D. H. Morgan Manufacturing and Arrow Dynamics hypercoasters. Now it has become one of the more preferred models with a success rate second only to the Inverted Coaster. In 2012, B&M decided to increase the size of its hyper coaster to exceed 300 feet. Some enthusiasts therefore classify it as a giga Coaster, although Giga coaster is a term used by Intamin for its 300-plus-foot coasters. B&M still refers to all of its models as hyper coasters.

The design of the hyper coaster includes a large lift hill then a large drop with a steep angle of descent and typically includes floater and ejector airtime hills. Only one of the B&M Hypers does not have a long out-and back layout: Raging Bull at Six Flags Great America. which features more of a twister layout. According to B&M the Hyper Coasters are a -High speed, no inversion coasters specially designed to create air time. A comfortable patented lapbar procures an incomparable feeling of freedom.-

The trains feature seven to nine cars of one row with four seats, resulting in each train seating 28 to 36 riders. Depending on the dispatch time and the number of trains the coasters typically have an hourly capacity of 1,200 to 1,500 people. Each seat features a unique clamshell restraint. Some trains used on B&M Hyper Coasters feature staggered seats, where the two outer seats are located farther back than the two center seats. This makes for a more open experience. Currently this staggered seating arrangement is only featured on four coasters: Behemoth at Canada’s Wonderland, Diamondback at Kings Island , Intimidator at Carowinds & Shambhala at PortAventura Park.

Golden Ticket Awards 

The B&M Hyper Coaster has been the most successful model in the Golden Ticket Awards:

List of hypercoasters
The following is a list of roller coasters with a height of at least . Some enthusiasts do not consider shuttle-type roller coasters to be hypercoasters, so those are listed separately.

Complete circuit

Shuttle

* Denotes a hypercoaster that is also a giga coaster, a roller coaster that exceeds  in height.

** Denotes a hypercoaster that is also a strata coaster, a roller coaster that exceeds  in height.

*** Denotes a hypercoaster that is not taller than 200 feet, but has a drop of over 200 feet.

**** Denotes a giga coaster that is not taller than 300 feet, but has a drop of over 300 feet.

B&M installations

Gallery

Notes

References

External links
 
 

 
Types of roller coaster